The CONCACAF Gold Cup is the main association football  competition of the men's national football teams governed by CONCACAF, determining the continental champion of North America, Central America, and the Caribbean. A hat-trick occurs when a player scores three or more goals in a single match and it is considered an achievement in association football, especially at the international level. Since the start of the competition, 17 hat-tricks have been scored across 16 editions.

Hat-tricks

References 

hat-tricks
CONCACAF Gold Cup
CONCACAF Gold Cup